Pontibacter virosus is a Gram-negative, rod-shaped and motile  bacterium from the genus of Pontibacter which has been isolated from soil which was contaminated with hexachlorocyclohexane from Ummari in India.

References

External links
Type strain of Pontibacter virosus at BacDive -  the Bacterial Diversity Metadatabase

Cytophagia
Bacteria described in 2016